Duke Maximilian Emanuel in Bavaria (7 December 1849 – 12 June 1893) was a German prince of the House of Wittelsbach, and a brother of Elisabeth of Bavaria. He married Princess Amalie of Saxe-Coburg and Gotha in 1875, and had three children with her.

Biography

Born on 7 December 1849 in Munich, Maximilian Emanuel was the tenth and youngest child of Duke Maximilian Joseph in Bavaria and Princess Ludovika of Bavaria. He expressed an interest in the army at a young age, becoming a second lieutenant in the 2nd Royal Bavarian Uhlans in 1865. He participated in the War of 1866 on the side of Austria, fighting in the battles of Hünfeld and Hammelburg.

Maximilian Emanuel developed severe gastric bleeding in 1893, passing away in June of that year.

Marriage and issue
Maximilian Emanuel married Princess Amalie of Saxe-Coburg and Gotha, fourth child and second eldest daughter of Prince August of Saxe-Coburg and Gotha and his wife Princess Clémentine of Orléans, on 20 September 1875 in Ebenthal, Lower Austria, Austria-Hungary. Maximilian Emanuel and Amalie had three sons:

Duke Siegfried August in Bavaria (10 July 1876 – 12 March 1952)
Duke Christoph Joseph Klemens Maria in Bavaria (22 April 1879 – 10 July 1963). He was married to Anna Sibig (18 July 1874 – 1 January 1958)
Duke Luitpold Emanuel Ludwig Maria in Bavaria (30 June 1890 – 16 January 1973)

Honours
He received the following orders and decorations:

 :
 Knight of St. Hubert
 Commander of the Military Merit Order
 : Grand Cross of Henry the Lion
 : Military Merit Cross, 2nd Class
 : Knight of the Golden Fleece, 1875
  Kingdom of Prussia:
 Knight of the Black Eagle, 11 September 1872
 Iron Cross (1870), 2nd Class
    Ernestine duchies: Grand Cross of the Saxe-Ernestine House Order, 1875

Ancestry

References

Bibliography 
 Damien Bilteryst, Olivier Defrance, Joseph van Loon: Les Biederstein, cousins oubliés de la reine Élisabeth, années 1875-1906. Museum Dynasticum, Bruxelles, XXXIV/1 2022.

1849 births
1893 deaths
Dukes in Bavaria
House of Wittelsbach
Nobility from Munich
German Roman Catholics
Members of the Bavarian Reichsrat
Recipients of the Military Merit Order (Bavaria)
Recipients of the Military Merit Cross (Mecklenburg-Schwerin)
Knights of the Golden Fleece of Austria
Recipients of the Iron Cross (1870), 2nd class
Military personnel from Munich